Blood Work is a 2002 American mystery thriller film starring and directed by Clint Eastwood, who also producer. It co-stars Jeff Daniels, Wanda De Jesús, and Anjelica Huston. It is based on the 1998 novel of the same name by Michael Connelly.

Eastwood won the Future Film Festival Digital Award at the Venice Film Festival.

Plot
During a federal investigation into a local homicide, FBI Special Agent Terry McCaleb goes outside to address the media, but spots the so-called "code murderer" in the crowd. He chases the man and wounds him, but the chase ends when McCaleb suffers a heart attack.

Retired, McCaleb lives in a houseboat on the Long Beach bay. He receives a second chance at life with a heart transplant. He is approached by Graciella Rivers; her sister, Gloria, was murdered during a robbery and she asks him to solve the case. He discovers that the heart transplanted into him was Gloria's. He has nightmares of the robbery during which Gloria was murdered.

McCaleb, against the advice of his physician, decides to find the real murderer with the help of houseboat neighbor Jasper "Buddy" Noone and local police detective Jaye Winston. McCaleb's path leads to several wrong suspects, before he eventually realizes that Buddy is the real killer.

Buddy reveals that he has kidnapped Graciella and her nephew, Gloria's son Raymond. There is a shootout on a wrecked, marooned fishing boat. After McCaleb wounds Buddy a second time, Buddy attempts to reach for his gun only to be shot dead by McCaleb. Buddy's dying words and said: "I saved you." Graciella then reaches over and holds Buddy's face underwater, participating in his execution, and getting justice for her murdered sister. However, McCaleb starts another new life with Graciella and Raymond.

Cast

 Clint Eastwood as Terry McCaleb
 Jeff Daniels as Jasper "Buddy" Noone
 Anjelica Huston as Dr. Bonnie Fox
 Wanda De Jesús as Graciella Rivers
 Tina Lifford as Detective Jaye Winston
 Paul Rodriguez as Detective Ronaldo Arrango
 Dylan Walsh as Detective John Waller
 Rick Hoffman as James Lockridge
 Alix Koromzay as Mrs. Cordell
 Igor Jijikine as Mikhail Bolotov
 Dina Eastwood as Reporter #1
 Beverly Leech as Reporter #2
 Maria Quiban as Gloria Torres
 Brent Hinkley as Cab Driver

Production
Blood Work was filmed in spring 2002 in Los Angeles and Long Beach, California, in 38 days.

Reception
Blood Work received mixed reviews. It has a score of 54% on Rotten Tomatoes, saying it was "a routine, but competently made thriller marred by lethargic pacing." However, A. O. Scott of The New York Times wrote while it was similar to many Eastwood films, "there is something comforting in seeing this old warhorse trot gamely out of the gate for yet another run on familiar turf."

The film was not a box office success, grossing $31.8 million worldwide on a budget of $50 million.

References

External links

 
 
 
 
 
 

2002 films
2002 crime thriller films
2000s American films
2000s English-language films
2000s mystery thriller films
2000s police procedural films
2000s serial killer films
American films about revenge
American crime thriller films
American police detective films
American mystery thriller films
American serial killer films
Films about the Federal Bureau of Investigation
Fictional portrayals of the Los Angeles Police Department
Films about murderers
Films about organ transplantation
Films based on mystery novels
Films directed by Clint Eastwood
Films produced by Clint Eastwood
Films scored by Lennie Niehaus
Films set in Los Angeles
Films set in California
Films set on boats
Films shot in Los Angeles
Films shot in Long Beach, California
Films with screenplays by Brian Helgeland
Malpaso Productions films
Warner Bros. films